Producers' Workshop is a Canadian dramatic and documentary television series which aired on CBC Television in 1955.

Premise
This series presented a variety of fiction and non-fiction works. Documentaries included subjects such as the Rebellions of 1837 and bees. In another episode, CBC Radio's Of All Things was given a television adaptation with host Austin Willis. Plays seen on Producers' Workshop included Big Boys Shouldn't Cry (Ted Allan), Flesh Of My Flesh (Guy Parent producer; Mac Shoub writer), The Strike (George Salverson) and The Vise (Luigi Pirandello writer).

Scheduling
This half-hour series was broadcast Fridays at 10:30 p.m. (Eastern) from 8 July to 2 September 1955.

References

External links
 

CBC Television original programming
1950s Canadian anthology television series
1955 Canadian television series debuts
1955 Canadian television series endings
Black-and-white Canadian television shows